WAWF (88.3 MHz) is a Christian radio station licensed to Kankakee, Illinois and serving Kankakee County, Illinois and northern Iroquois County.  WAWF is owned and operated by Family Worship Center Church, Inc. The station began broadcasting in 2000. It was originally owned by the American Family Association and was an affiliate of American Family Radio. In 2004, the station was sold to Family Worship Center Church, along with WBMF and WWGN, for $1 million.

References

External links
 SONLIFE Radio Network Online
 

AWF
Radio stations established in 2000
2000 establishments in Illinois